The 1997 Overseas Final was the seventeenth running of the Overseas Final. The Final was held at the Odsal Stadium in Bradford, England on 22 June and was open to riders from the American Final and the Australian, British, New Zealand and South African Championships.

1997 Overseas Final
22 June
 Bradford, Odsal Stadium
Qualification: Top 8 plus 1 reserve to the Intercontinental Final in Västervik, Sweden

References

See also
 Motorcycle Speedway

1997
World Individual